Maria Alinica "Nikki" Valdez-Garcia (born January 25, 1979) is a Filipina actress and singer.

Career
In the Philippine music scene she was known for a ballad titled "Meron Ba?", composed for the soundtrack of G-Mik the Movie and Trip the Movie (2002), and for starring in the lead role in the F.L.A.M.E.S (1996–2002) TV series. Valdez made her comeback to daytime television in the second installment of Precious Hearts Romances, titled Ang Lalaking Nagmahal sa Akin, after her last role in Walang Kapalit in 2007. She later worked with Kaye Abad and fellow newcomer Guji Lorenzana in Precious Hearts Romances' third installment, Somewhere in My Heart, as Amanda in 2009.

In 2010, Valdez appeared in Magkano ang Iyong Dangal? and co-starred with John Lloyd Cruz and Angel Locsin in the second book and second season of the successful TV series Imortal.

In 2012, she worked alongside Star Magic alumni and ABS-CBN actors Shaina Magdayao and Jake Cuenca and again with Magkano Ang Iyong Dangal? co-star Bangs Garcia in the top-rated afternoon soap Kung Ako'y Iiwan Mo.

Personal life
Valdez was married to Filipino Canadian Christopher Lina from 2007 to 2011. They had been together since 2002 and were married in Canada through a civil union on February 14, 2007, and in a Christian wedding in Makati on July 7, 2007. Following their marriage, she relocated with her husband to Toronto, where they had a daughter. Their daughter was born with a birth defect called symbrachydactyly. Valdez and Lina separated in 2009. She has since moved back to the Philippines following the separation. In an interview, Valdez cited the intervention of a third party in their marriage as the reason for their separation. Their divorce was finalized by a Canadian court in 2011. However, their Christian wedding in the Philippines has yet to be annulled.

Following her divorce with Lina, Valdez had been in a relationship with ABS-CBN sales executive Luis Garcia since 2014. During their relationship's third anniversary in 2017, Garcia proposed to her while on vacation in Vigan. The two married at a private ceremony in Hong Kong on August 18, 2018.

Filmography

Television/Digital

Film

References

External links

Star Magic
Filipino television actresses
Living people
Filipino film actresses
Filipino women comedians
ABS-CBN personalities
1981 births
Actresses from Laguna (province)